The Men's 4 × 100 metre medley relay competition at the 2022 World Aquatics Championships was held on 25 June 2022.

Records
Prior to the competition, the existing world and championship records were as follows.

Results

Heats
The heats were started at 09:21.

Final
The final was held at 19:20.

References

Men's 4 x 100 metre medley relay